Lygephila subpicata is a moth of the family Erebidae first described by Wiltshire in 1971. It is found in northern and western Iran.

Adults differ from the sister species Lygephila pallida in the length and shape of the ampulla, and in vesica and aedeagus structure.

References

Moths described in 1971
Toxocampina